Medal of Freedom may refer to:

Presidential Medal of Freedom
Medal of Freedom (1945), replaced in 1963 by the Presidential Medal of Freedom
 Truman–Reagan Medal of Freedom, presented by the Victims of Communism Memorial Foundation